Jennifer Leigh Thurston (born 1967) is an American judge who is a United States district judge of the United States District Court for the Eastern District of California. She previously served as the Chief United States magistrate judge of the same court.

Early life and education 

Thurston was born in 1967 in Bakersfield, California. She received her Bachelor of Science from California State University, Bakersfield in 1989 and her Juris Doctor from the California Pacific School of Law in 1997 and her Master of Laws from Duke University in 2018.

Legal career 

From 1997 to 2009, she served as deputy county counsel for the office of county counsel in Bakersfield.

Federal judicial service

United States magistrate judge service 

Thurston served as a U.S. magistrate judge of the Eastern District of California from December 31, 2009, to December 27, 2021. She was chief U.S. magistrate judge for the district from October 2020 to December 2021.

District court service 

On September 8, 2021, President Joe Biden announced his intent to nominate Thurston to serve as a United States district judge of the United States District Court for the Eastern District of California. On September 20, 2021, her nomination was sent to the Senate. President Biden nominated Thurston to the seat vacated by Judge Lawrence Joseph O'Neill, who assumed senior status on February 2, 2020. On October 20, 2021, a hearing on her nomination was held before the Senate Judiciary Committee. On December 2, 2021, her nomination was reported out of committee by a 13–9 vote. On December 17, 2021, the United States Senate invoked cloture on her nomination by a 46–24 vote. That same day, her nomination was confirmed by a 46–24 vote. She received her judicial commission on December 27, 2021.

References

External links 

1967 births
Living people
20th-century American women lawyers
20th-century American lawyers
21st-century American women lawyers
21st-century American judges
21st-century American lawyers
21st-century American women judges
California lawyers
California State University, Bakersfield alumni
Duke University alumni
Judges of the United States District Court for the Eastern District of California
McGeorge School of Law alumni
People from Bakersfield, California
United States district court judges appointed by Joe Biden
United States magistrate judges